Associations for Defence of National Rights were regional resistance organisations established in the Ottoman Empire between 1918–1919 that pledged themselves to the Defence of National Rights movement. They would eventually unite into the Association for the Defence of Rights of Anatolia and Rumelia in the Sivas Congress.

Background
Following the defeat of the Ottoman Empire in the First World War, the Ottoman army was disarmed according to the Armistice of Mudros. Although the Ottoman Empire had to agree to give up vast areas including most of Middle East, the Allies further retained the power of controlling what was left of the Ottoman Empire, namely Turkey. It soon became clear that the Allies were planning to allocate parts of Turkey to Armenia and Greece. Parenthetically, southern Anatolia was put under French and Italian mandate.

The national associations
The occupations, especially that of İzmir, caused deep reactions among the Ottoman people. Several patriotic associations were formed simultaneously in different parts of Turkey as a result. The former Unionists as well as nationalistic soldiers and intellectuals, were active in these associations and were struggling to have their voices heard by peaceful methods like protesting, meetings, and publishing notices, which were not effective at changing the Allies' policy.

After the Congress of Sivas
During the Congress of Sivas held in September 1919, these associations were united under the name of "Association for the Defence of National Rights of Anatolia and Rumelia". This unified organisation became the main political force in Turkey up to the end of the Turkish War of Independence. Its chairman was Mustafa Kemal (later surnamed Atatürk), who would go on to become modern Turkey's founding father. After the war of independence and the Treaty of Lausanne, Atatürk proposed to change the name of the organisation to the People's Party on 9 September 1923, just one year after the liberation of İzmir. After the Republic was proclaimed, the unified organisation was renamed to the Republican People's Party (CHP), which would rule Turkey until 1950, and remains one of Turkey's main political parties to this day.

List of associations
The following are associations that took part in the grouping (with their location or main group component listed in parenthesis).
Şarkî Anadolu Müdafaa-i Hukuk Cemiyeti (East Anatolia)
İzmir Müdafaa-i Hukuku Osmaniye Cemiyeti (İzmir)
İstihlası Vatan Cemiyeti (Manisa)
Trakya-Paşaeli Müdafaa-i Hukuk Cemiyeti (East Thrace)
Trabzon Muhafaza-i Hukuku Milliye Cemiyeti (Trabzon)
Kilikyalılar Cemiyeti (Adana-Mersin)
Hareket-i Milliye ve Redd-i İlhak Teşkilatları (İzmir)
Adana Vilayeti Müdafaa-i Hukuk Cemiyeti (Adana)
Kozan Müdafaa-i Hukuk Cemiyeti (Kozan)
Anadolu Kadınları Müdafaa-i Vatan Cemiyeti (Women's organisation)

References 

Turkish War of Independence
1918 in the Ottoman Empire
1919 in the Ottoman Empire
Turkey
Republican People's Party (Turkey) politicians
Organizations established in 1918
Organizations established in 1919
Anti-imperialism